is a railway station in Atsubetsu-ku, Sapporo, Hokkaido, Japan, operated by the Hokkaido Railway Company (JR Hokkaido) and the Sapporo Municipal Subway. The JR Hokkaido station number is "H05", while the Sapporo Municipal Subway station number is "T19". The name of the Sapporo Municipal Subway station is written "新さっぽろ駅", to differentiate it from the JR Hokkaido station.

Station layout

JR Hokkaido
The station consists of two elevated opposed side platforms serving two tracks. The station has automated ticket machines, automated turnstiles which accept Kitaca, and a "Midori no Madoguchi" staffed ticket office.

Platforms

Tōzai Line
The Sapporo Municipal Subway station consists of one island platform between two tracks on the second basement level, located east of the JR Hokkaido station.

Platforms

Adjacent stations

JR Hokkaido

History
The JR Hokkaido station (formerly JNR) opened on 9 September 1973. The subway station opened on 21 March 1982.

Surrounding area
 
 Sapporo Atsubetsu Ward Office
 Atsubetsu Ward Gymnasium
 Atsubetsu Shin-Sapporo Police Station
 Atsubetsu Postal Office
 Bus Station Shin-Sapporo
 Sapporo Science Center
 Sunpiazza Shopping Center
 Sunpiazza Aquarium
 Hotel Emisia Sapporo
 Docon

Gallery

See also
 List of railway stations in Japan

References

External links

 Shin-Sapporo JR Hokkaido map

 

Railway stations in Japan opened in 1973
Railway stations in Sapporo
Sapporo Municipal Subway